Abade António da Costa (1714–1780) was a Portuguese composer.

See also
List of Portuguese composers

External links

 Drei Sonaten für drei Violinen - on-going cooperative transcription in the Wiki-score platform of the manuscript score of trios IV, V, VI for three violins by Abade António Costa .

References

1714 births
1780 deaths
Portuguese composers
Portuguese male composers
Musicians from Porto
18th-century Portuguese people
18th-century composers
18th-century male musicians
18th-century musicians